Red Skies over Paradise is a 1981 album by Fischer-Z. This was the last album released under the classic line-up, despite the departure of keyboardist Steve Skolnik. This album featured many songs about politics and several references to the Cold War, the album title and cover in particular. The album received positive reviews from fans and encouraged band leader John Watts to pursue a solo career, thus ending Fischer-Z until its revival in 1987. Two of these songs were used in Deutschland 83. The sleeve stated: "This record owes a lot to Brighton."

Track listing
All songs written and arranged by John Watts

Side A
"Berlin" - 4:32
"Marliese" - 3:52
"Red Skies over Paradise (A Brighton Dream)" - 4:32
"In England" - 2:43
"You'll Never Find Brian Here" - 2:08
"Battalions of Strangers" - 5:03
Side B
"Song and Dance Brigade" - 3:02
"The Writer" - 3:20
"Bathroom Scenario" - 3:47
"Wristcutter's Lullaby" - 2:46
"Cruise Missiles" - 4:15
"Luton to Lisbon/Multinationals Bite" - 5:34

Charts

Personnel
Fischer-Z
John Watts - lead vocals, guitar, keyboards
David Graham - bass, bass pedals, backing vocals
Steve Liddle - drums, backing vocals
Technical
Steve Parker - mix engineer
John Pasche - art direction
Philip Dunn - artwork, painting

Sales and certifications

Notes
The album features the singles, "Marliese", "Wristcutter's Lullaby" (b/w "You'll Never Find Brian Here") and "The Writer".

References

1981 albums
Fischer-Z albums
Liberty Records albums